Marereni is a small town in Kenya's Coast Province.Latitude and Longitude of Marereni
are: Latitude: -2.86917, Longitude: 40.1456.

References 

Populated places in Coast Province